The Greek National Tourism Organisation (Ethnikos Organismos Tourismou), often abbreviated as GNTO is the governmental Board for the promotion of tourism in Greece. It functions under the supervision of the Ministry of Tourism.

History
The Greek National Tourism Organisation (GNTO), that was founded in 1929 and was re-established in 1950, is a Public Entity (PE) under the supervision of the Ministry of Tourism. Its main mission nowadays is to develop and promote the Greek tourism product through the implementation of promotional tourism campaigns both in Greece and abroad utilizing as well its extensive network of overseas offices. Moreover, with its vast experience and expertise and its large network of associates and stakeholders both in Greece and abroad, the GNTO has been and continues to be fundamental in the national effort of promoting "Greece", this truly unique and amazing destination, both cost-effectively and efficiently. It is member of the UNWTO and the ETC.'/>

Promotion work

Over the years, various successful advertising campaigns have been funded by the organization, including the very successful "Live your myth in Greece" campaign. The 2010 campaign's motto was "You in Greece" and "xx in Greece", and mainly focused on the many opportunities the country provides for tourists, with a variety of different destinations and activities. "You in Athens" and "You in Thessaloniki" were also used to promote the country's two largest cities and centers of culture and entertainment. The 2010 advertising campaign published a variety of promotional TV spots in line with the "You in Greece" poster campaign, which were translated to various languages, including Chinese, Bulgarian, and German.

Previous campaign slogans include:
"Live your Myth in Greece" (2005)
"Greece 5000 years old: a masterpiece you can afford"
"Greece: explore your senses"
"My Greek experience" (2008; TV commercials using amateur videos)
"Greece: Kalimera!" (2009)
"Greece: You in Greece" (2010)
"Greece: All Time Classic" (2014)
"Greece: A 365 Day Destination" (2017)
"Greece: Always in Season" (2020)
"All you want is Greece" (2021)

Offices abroad
Currently the GNTO operates offices in the following countries:

See also
Tourism in Greece

References

External links
VISIT GREECE website
Hellenic Ministry of Culture and Tourism website

1927 establishments in Greece
Government agencies of Greece
Tourism agencies
Tourism in Greece